Liti or LITI may refer to:
 Lity (Orthodox Vespers), a procession at Great Vespers in the Eastern Orthodox Church
 Lity (Orthodox memorial service), a short service for the dead in the Eastern Orthodox Church
 David Liti (born 1996), New Zealand weightlifter
 Livestock Training Institute (LITI), a college in Morogoro, Tanzania

See also 
 Lete (disambiguation)
 Leti (disambiguation)
 Lity (disambiguation)
 Lite (disambiguation)